Munshigiri (Bengali: মুন্সিগিরি Munsigiriḥ) is a Bangladeshi mystery drama film directed by Amitabh Reza Chowdhury from a script by Naseef Amin for Chorki. Based on the novel Mriterao Kotha Bole by Shibabrata Barman, it stars Chanchal Chowdhury as Masood Munshi, Dilara Hanif Purnima as Suraiya Akhter, and Sabnam Faria as Parveen Sultana. It is released via Chorki on 30 September 2021.

This is going to be the first installment of the trilogy franchise Munshigiri. It is a character-driven franchise and Masood Munshi is the protagonist played by Chanchal Chowdhury. The story revolves around Munshi, who is an Additional Deputy Police Commission (ADC) from the detective branch (DB) of Bangladesh Police. How he deals with his personal and professional life, this is the story.

Munshigiri has been produced by Chorki in association with Half Stop Down and presented by Daraz.

Premise

Cast 
Chanchal Chowdhury – Masood Munshi
Dilara Hanif Purnima – Suraiya Akter 
Sabnam Faria – Parveen Sultana 
Gazi Rakayet – Ishtiaque Mirza
Shahiduzzaman Selim – Additional Police Commissioner
Khandaker Lenin – Bipin
Kazi Anisul Haque Borun – Khorshed
Imtiaz Barshon – Ali Aqbar
Tasnia Rahman – Sharmili Anwar
Ashoke Bepari – Idris Mawla
Ahsan Habib Nasim –  ADC Wahid

Production 
This is the first time, any Bangladeshi-origin detective story is going to be adopted into a film. The director has waited two years to make this film. And the director and producers have the plan to make two more sequels to this film. Chorki has announced Munshigiri on 15 January 2021. On the same day it is announced that Naseef Amin will write a script based on the novel Mriterao Kotha Bole by Shibabrata Barman, and Chanchal Chowdhury and Dilara Hanif Purnima were cast in the lead roles. On 28 January 2021, Sabnam Faria joined the cast of the film. Filming began on 15 February 2021.

In an interview with Sara Fairuz Zaima director Amitabh Reza Chowdhury said that principal photography has taken place in Karwan Bazar, Bakshi Bazar, Bangla Bazar, and different other locations in Dhaka. He also added that filming has been interrupted three times due to COVID-19 breakdown related lockdown in Bangladesh.

Release
On 28 September 2021, the trailer of Munshigiri was released on social media by Chorki. On 30 September 2021, the film was released digitally worldwide via Chorki.

Reception
Siffat Bin Ayub of The Business Standard rated Munshigiri 7 out of 10 and praises its cinematography. In his review for The Financial Express, Shadya Naher Sheyam described Munshigiri as "The growth and treatment of mystery in the novel and cinema differ greatly. Even though some minor plot holes popped up, the deviation that took place between the mediums is handled in a subtle way".

References

External links
 

2021 films
Chorki original films
Bengali-language Bangladeshi films
Bangladeshi mystery films
Films scored by Jahid Nirob
Bangladeshi detective films
Bangladeshi crime thriller films
2020s Bengali-language films